Voluyak Rocks (‘Skali Voluyak’ ska-'li vo-'lu-yak) is a chain of rocks off the north coast of Greenwich Island in the South Shetland Islands, Antarctica situated  north of Pavlikeni Point.  Extending  in southeast–northwest direction.

The rocks are named after the settlement of Voluyak in western Bulgaria.

Location

See also 
 Composite Antarctic Gazetteer
 List of Antarctic islands south of 60° S
 SCAR
 Territorial claims in Antarctica

Map
L.L. Ivanov. Antarctica: Livingston Island and Greenwich, Robert, Snow and Smith Islands. Scale 1:120000 topographic map.  Troyan: Manfred Wörner Foundation, 2009.

Notes

References
 Voluyak Rocks. Composite Antarctic Gazetteer.
 Bulgarian Antarctic Gazetteer. Antarctic Place-names Commission. (details in Bulgarian, basic data in English)

External links
 Voluyak Rocks. Copernix satellite image

Rock formations of Greenwich Island
Bulgaria and the Antarctic